Highways & Honky Tonks is the fourth album by Heather Myles, and the first with her new record company Rounder Records. There is a cover of the old Charley Pride song "Kiss an Angel Good Morning," and Merle Haggard drops in for a guest appearance on the duet "No One Is Gonna Love You Better." Myles wrote ten of the twelve songs herself.

Track listing
"You're Gonna Love Me One Day" (Heather Myles) – 3:16
"Kiss an Angel Good Morning" (Ben Peters) – 2:34
"You've Taken Me Places I Wish I'd Never Been" (Heather Myles) – 2:24
"Broken Heart for Sale" (Heather Myles) – 3:01
"True Love" (Heather Myles) – 3:55
"No One Is Gonna Love You Better" [with Merle Haggard] (Heather Myles) – 3:16
"Playin' Every Honky Tonk in Town" (Heather Myles) – 2:40
"Mr. Lonesome" (Heather Myles) – 2:38
"Rock at the End of My Rainbow" (Heather Myles) – 2:30
"Who Did You Call Darlin'?" (Heather Myles) – 3:03
"Love Me a Little Bit Longer" (Heather Myles) – 3:23
"I'll Be There (If You Ever Want Me)" (Ray Price/Rusty Gabbard) – 2:15

Reception

Billboard said that Myles "hit a home run" with Highway and Honky Tonks. Alternatively, Richie Unterberger of AllMusic said that while the album's lyrics were not original, Unterberger believed Myles' honesty and performance was excellent. When reviewing the songs, No Depression believed the song that did not sound good was "No One Is Gonna Love You Better", calling it "the album's only real weak moment".

References

Heather Myles albums
1998 albums